Defeated Creek is a stream in Hickman County, Tennessee, in the United States.

Hickman County namesake Edwin Hickman was killed by Indians at Defeated Creek.

See also
List of rivers of Tennessee

References

Rivers of Hickman County, Tennessee
Rivers of Tennessee